The Cruel Treatment of Cattle Act 1822 (3 Geo. IV c. 71) was an Act of the Parliament of the United Kingdom with the long title "An Act to prevent the cruel and improper Treatment of Cattle"; it is sometimes known as Martin's Act, after the MP and animal rights campaigner Richard Martin. It is the first pieces of animal welfare legislation in recorded history. The Act listed "ox, cow, heifer, steer, sheep, or other cattle". This was held not to include bulls. A further act (5 & 6 Will. IV. c. 59 s. 2) extended the wording of this Act to remedy the issue. This Act was repealed by the Cruelty to Animals Act 1849.

See also 
 Animal welfare in the United Kingdom

References

Animal welfare and rights legislation in the United Kingdom
Cruelty to animals
Repealed United Kingdom Acts of Parliament
United Kingdom Acts of Parliament 1822